James Hamilton (25 December 1942 – 17 June 1996) was a British DJ and dance music columnist for Record Mirror, and later for Music Week, where he worked until his death in 1996. He is recognised as a pioneering advocate of disco mixing in the UK and the addition of beats per minute (bpm) calculations to record reviews.

Hamilton started as a DJ in his early 20s, playing rhythm & blues in a nightclubs in London. He then headed to New York to work for Seltaeb, the US company who had acquired the merchandising rights for the Beatles, becoming a talent scout for their newly formed music division. After returning to the UK, he adopted the DJ name Doctor Soul, and also compiled an album with this title for Sue Records. He set up as one of the first mobile DJs, and began writing US reviews for Record Mirror in 1964. In 1975, he began the magazine's weekly ‘Disco’ column, named James Hamilton's Disco Page. He pioneered several features that was copied by other dance music based publications, like a club chart calculated on returns from disco and club DJs, as well as Hot Vinyl reviews of import and promotional records. In 1979, he introduced another innovation by giving beats per minute (bpm) calculations of record tempos, thus helping working DJs catch up with the new Americon innovation of mixing and blending records together. In the 1980s he, with Les Adams of L.A. Mix, made New Year's Eve mix shows on Capital Radio. The show continued until 1994. In April 1991, his column became a part of Music Weeks RM Dance Update. 

Hamilton's 'jiddery stuttering, hi hat driven, throbbing 120-130bpm' style of writing was loved throughout the music industry. His reviews were regarded with almost blblical zeal by the DJ fraternity, many of whom would buy records sight unseen on the basis of his reviews. He died on 17 June 1996 in Blyth, Nottinghamshire, due to cancer of the colon. DJ, music producer and radio presenter Pete Tong said after his death, "No-one has ever got close to him in terms of respect as a journalist. I think the reason he had authority was that because he'd been around for so long, he was drawing on such a wealth of knowledge that even if you didn't agree with what he said you had to respect his opinion."

References

External links
James Hamilton's Disco Page
James Hamilton on AllMusic
James Hamilton on Discogs
James Hamilton Public Group on Facebook

1942 births
1996 deaths
British DJs
British music critics
British music journalists
Deaths from cancer in England
Deaths from colorectal cancer